Sigalet is a surname. Notable people with the surname include:

Jonathan Sigalet (born 1986), Canadian ice hockey player
Jordan Sigalet (born 1981), Canadian ice hockey player